The 2022 Preakness Stakes was the 147th Preakness Stakes, a Grade I stakes race for three-year-old Thoroughbreds at a distance of  miles (1.9 km).  The race is one leg of the American Triple Crown and is held annually at Pimlico Race Course in Baltimore, Maryland. The Preakness Stakes is traditionally held on the third Saturday in May, two weeks after the Kentucky Derby.

The 2022 Preakness took place on May 21 with television coverage by NBC. The race was won by Early Voting.

Field
The Preakness traditionally features the winner of the Kentucky Derby competing against other runners from that race as well as some "new shooters" – horses that either bypassed the Derby or did not qualify. However, it was announced that Kentucky Derby winner Rich Strike would not be competing at the Preakness, citing the horse's condition and need for rest, and therefore the horse gave up the chance to become a Triple Crown winner. Had Rich Strike competed, he would not have entered the race as the favorite. As a result, this would be just the second instance since 1996 that the Kentucky Derby winner did not run in the Preakness.

A field of nine was drawn for the Preakness Stakes on Monday, May 16; the contenders included Epicenter, Early Voting, and  Kentucky Oaks winner Secret Oath. Epicenter was installed as the 6–5 favorite.

Entries

Results
Early Voting, who entered the race as the second most favored contender with 7-2 odds, won the 2022 Preakness Stakes. Favored contender Epicenter finished second.

References

External links 
 

2022
2022 in horse racing
2022 in American sports
May 2022 sports events in the United States
Horse races in Maryland
2022 in sports in Maryland